Marjorie Haines (November 18, 1928 – June 7, 2014) was an American equestrian. She competed in two events at the 1952 Summer Olympics.

References

External links
 

1928 births
2014 deaths
American female equestrians
American dressage riders
Olympic equestrians of the United States
Equestrians at the 1952 Summer Olympics
People from Montgomery County, Pennsylvania
21st-century American women